Emmanuelle Béart (born 14 August 1963) is a French film and television actress, who has appeared in over 60 film and television productions since 1972. An eight-time César Award nominee, she won the César Award for Best Supporting Actress for the 1986 film Manon des Sources. Her other film roles include La Belle Noiseuse (1991), A Heart in Winter (1992), Nelly and Mr. Arnaud (1995), Mission: Impossible (1996) and 8 Women (2002).

Early life 
Béart was born Emmanuelle Béhart-Hasson in St. Tropez (some sources say Gassin), on the French Riviera, the daughter of Geneviève Galéa (pseudonym of Geneviève Guillery), a former model who is of Croatian, Greek and Maltese descent, and Guy Béart, a singer and poet. Her Egyptian-born father's family was of Sephardic Jewish descent, who later sought refuge in Lebanon during his childhood. 

She has a half-sister, Ève (born 1959), on her father's side and six half-siblings on her mother's side; Ivan, Sarah and Mikis Cerieix from her mother's relationship with Jean-Yves Cerieix and Olivier Guespin, Lison and Charlotte from her mother's relationship with Jean-Jacques Guespin.  

In her late teens, she spent her summer vacation with the English-speaking family of a close friend of her father in Montreal. She stayed with Beverly Mellen and William Sofin and their two children Andrew and Sean Sofin, who took her in as their own. At the end of the summer, the family invited her to stay with them and complete her baccalauréat at Collège International Marie de France. They have remained close friends.

Career 

Béart got an acting role in 1976 film Tomorrow's Children. In her teens she appeared in bit parts in television. Upon graduating from the Collège International Marie de France in Montreal, she returned to France to attend drama school in Paris. A short time later, she was cast in her first adult role in a film, and in 1986 she achieved fame with her role opposite Yves Montand, playing the avenging daughter in French hit Manon des Sources. For her performance, she won the 1987 César Award for Best Supporting Actress. In the 1987 film Date with an Angel, she starred as the Angel. In 1995, she won the Silver St. George for Best Actress award at the 19th Moscow International Film Festival for her starring role in film A French Woman.

In addition to her award for Best Supporting Actress, she has also been nominated for another seven César Awards for Most Promising Actress and Best Actress. Béart received Most Promising Actress nominations for A Strange Passion and Love on the Quiet; followed by Best Actress nominations for Children of Chaos, La Belle Noiseuse (The Beautiful Troublemaker), Un cœur en hiver (A Heart in Winter), Nelly et Monsieur Arnaud (Nelly and Mr Arnaud), and Les Destinées Sentimentales (Sentimental Destinies)

In the 5 May 2003 issue of the French edition of Elle magazine, Béart, aged 39, appeared nude: The entire run of 550,000 copies sold out in just three days, making it the biggest-selling issue in the fashion glossy's long history.

Personal life 
In the mid-1980s, Béart began a relationship with Daniel Auteuil (her co-star in Love on the Quiet, Manon des Sources, A Heart in Winter and A French Woman); they married in 1993 and divorced in 1995. Béart was romantically linked to music producer David François Moreau (from c. 1995 after she separated from Auteuil) and to film producer Vincent Meyer for two years until his suicide in May 2003. She has three children, including Nelly Auteuil (born c. 1993) and Johan Moreau (born c. 1996). She married actor Michaël Cohen on 13 August 2008 at Genappe in Belgium, and in 2009 they adopted a child from Ethiopia, named Surafel. Béart and Cohen separated in 2011. In 2011, she began a romantic relationship with director and cinematographer Frédéric Chaudier.

In addition to her screen work, Béart is known for her social activism. She is an ambassador for UNICEF, and has made news for her opposition to France's anti-immigration legislation. In 1996, she made headlines when, defending the rights of the "sans-papiers" ("without papers", meaning illegal immigrants), she was removed after her group's occupation of a Parisian church.

In March 2012, Béart spoke out against plastic surgery in Le Monde, saying that she regretted having an operation on her lips in 1990 when she was 27.

Selected filmography

Film

Television 
 Le grand Poucet (1980)
 Zacharius (1984)
 Raison perdue (1984)
 La femme de sa vie (1986)
 Et demain viendra le jour (1986)
 Les jupons de la révolution (1 episode, 1989)
 D'Artagnan et les trois mousquetaires (2005)

Awards and nominations

References

Further reading

External links 

 
 
 

1963 births
Living people
People from Var (department)
European Film Award for Best Actress winners
French film actresses
French television actresses
20th-century French Sephardi Jews
Jewish French actresses
French people of Croatian descent
French people of Maltese descent
French people of Greek descent
French people of Lebanese-Jewish descent
French people of Egyptian-Jewish descent
Nannies
Best Supporting Actress César Award winners
David di Donatello winners
20th-century French actresses
21st-century French actresses
French stage actresses
Officiers of the Ordre des Arts et des Lettres
Chevaliers of the Légion d'honneur
French domestic workers
Mizrahi Jews